Ivan Petrovich Martos (1754 — 5 April 1835)  was Ukrainian and Russian sculptor and art teacher who helped awaken Russian interest in Neoclassical sculpture.

Biography
Martos was born between Chernihiv and Poltava in city of Ichnia and enrolled at the Imperial Academy of Arts between 1764 and 1773. He was then sent to further his education with Pompeo Batoni and Anton Raphael Mengs in Rome. Upon his return to Russia in 1779, Martos started to propagate the ideas of Neoclassicism. He executed a large number of marble tombs, which are often regarded as the finest in the history of Russian art.

Enjoying the patronage of the Russian royalty, Martos held a professorship at the Imperial Academy of Arts since 1779 and became its dean in 1814. His main claim to fame is the Monument to Minin and Pozharsky on Red Square, conceived in 1804 but not inaugurated until 1818. Owing to the many years he spent on this one work, Martos did not produce much other sculpture in the period.  He died at St Petersburg.

His later outdoor sculptures - those of Duke de Richelieu above the Potemkin Stairs in Odessa, Prince Potemkin in Kherson, Alexander I in Taganrog, and Mikhail Lomonosov in Kholmogory - became the symbols of those towns, although modern art critics often compare them unfavorably with his earlier, less bombastic works.

During the Soviet dictatorship Martos's memorial statues - including those of Nikita Panin and his family - were snatched from the cemeteries to be exhibited in the newly set up museums, while his colossal bronze statue of Catherine II, unveiled at the top of the Moscow Nobility Column Hall in 1812, was destroyed altogether.

Selected works

External links 
 
 

19th-century sculptors from the Russian Empire
19th-century male artists from the Russian Empire
20th-century Russian sculptors
20th-century Russian male artists
Russian male sculptors
Russian people of Ukrainian descent
Ukrainian sculptors
Neoclassical sculptors
1754 births
1835 deaths
People from Chernihiv Oblast
People from the Cossack Hetmanate
People from Kiev Governorate (1708–1764)
Burials at Lazarevskoe Cemetery (Saint Petersburg)
Ukrainian male sculptors